David Samuel Custódio Lima (born 20 February 2000), known as Pastor, is a Brazilian professional footballer who plays as a right-back for Farense.

Professional career
Pastor is a youth product of Elosport and Londrina, and began his senior career with them in the Campeonato Brasileiro Série C in January 2020. He moved to Ferroviária for the following season in the Campeonato Brasileiro Série D on 18 September 2020. On 1 July 2021, he joined Leixões on loan in the Liga Portugal 2. After 28 appearances with Leixões, he joined Portimonense on loan on 1 July 2022, in preparation for the 2022-23 season.

References

External links
 

2000 births
Living people
Footballers from Brasília
Brazilian footballers
Association football fullbacks
Londrina Esporte Clube players
Associação Ferroviária de Esportes players
Leixões S.C. players
Portimonense S.C. players
S.C. Farense players
Primeira Liga players
Liga Portugal 2 players
Campeonato Brasileiro Série C players
Campeonato Brasileiro Série D players
Campeonato Paranaense players
Brazilian expatriate footballers
Brazilian expatriates in Portugal